The lesser black-backed gull (Larus fuscus) is a large gull that breeds on the Atlantic coasts of Europe. It is migratory, wintering from the British Isles south to West Africa. It has increased dramatically in North America, most common along the east coast. Formerly just a winter visitor, many birds are now spotted year-round. Some winters they occur in large numbers. Even on the west coast, this species has become an annual winter visitor in California with birds reported around most of the state each winter. They've even been seen in numbers at the Salton Sea.

Taxonomy
The lesser black-backed gull was one of the many species originally described by Carl Linnaeus in his 1758 10th edition of Systema Naturae, and it still bears its original name Larus fuscus. The scientific name is from Latin. Larus appears to have referred to a gull or other large seabird, and fuscus meant black or brown.

Subspecies
The five recognized subspecies are:

L. f. graellsii Brehm, 1857: Greenland, Iceland, Faroe Islands, British Isles, western Europe - mantle dark grey
L. f. intermedius Schiøler, 1922: Netherlands, Germany, Denmark, southwest Sweden and western Norway - mantle sooty black
L. f. fuscus Linnaeus, 1758: northern Norway, Sweden and Finland to the White Sea - mantle jet black
L. f. heuglini Bree, 1876: northern Russia to north-central Siberia, known as Heuglin's gull, this was previously considered a separate species.
L. f. barabensis Johansen, 1960: central Asia

Description
The lesser black-backed gull is smaller than the European herring gull. The taxonomy of the herring gull / lesser black-backed gull complex is very complicated; different authorities recognise between two and eight species. This group has a ring species distribution around the Northern Hemisphere. Differences between adjacent forms in this ring are fairly small, but by the time the circuit is completed, the end members, herring gull and lesser black-backed gull, are clearly different species. A confusable species is the great black-backed gull. The lesser is a much smaller bird, with slimmer build, yellow rather than pinkish legs, and smaller white "mirrors" at the wing tips. The adults have black or dark grey wings (depending on race) and back. The bill is yellow with a red spot at which the young peck, inducing feeding (see fixed action pattern). The head is greyer in winter, unlike great black-backed gulls. Annual moult for adults begins between May and August and is not complete on some birds until November. Partial prebreeding moult occurs between January and April.

Young birds have scaly black-brown upperparts and a neat wing pattern. They take four years to reach maturity. Identification from juvenile herring gulls is most readily done by the more solidly dark (unbarred) tertial feathers.

Their call is a "laughing" cry like that of the herring gull, but with a markedly deeper pitch.

Breeding
This species breeds colonially on coasts and lakes, making a lined nest on the ground or a cliff. Normally, three eggs are laid. In some cities, the species nests within the urban environment, often in association with herring gulls.

Feeding
They are omnivores like most Larus gulls, and they eat fish, insects, crustaceans, worms, starfish, molluscs, seeds, berries, small mammals, eggs, small birds, chicks, scraps, offal, and carrion.

Gallery

References

External links

 Lesser black-backed gull pages on www.gull-research.org
 Lesser black-backed gulls in Amsterdam
 
 
 
 
 
 
 
 

lesser black-backed gull
Birds of Europe
Birds of Scandinavia
Birds of Africa
lesser black-backed gull
lesser black-backed gull
Holarctic birds